"The Only Hope for Me Is You" is a single from My Chemical Romance's fourth studio album, Danger Days: The True Lives of the Fabulous Killjoys as well as the sixth track on the album.

Release
The single was first released on October 12, 2010. The song is featured on the soundtrack for the movie Transformers: Dark of the Moon. The single was delayed later by a week until August 26 for Ireland and August 29 for the UK. The download single featured a remix of the track "The Kids from Yesterday" by Daniel P. Carter and their cover of "Common People" by Pulp recorded for Live Lounge on BBC Radio 1.

Track listing

Charts
The song debuted at number 84 on the Canadian Hot 100 on October 30, 2010.

References

2011 singles
My Chemical Romance songs
2010 songs
Reprise Records singles
Song recordings produced by Rob Cavallo
Songs written by Frank Iero
Songs written by Ray Toro
Songs written by Gerard Way
Songs written by Mikey Way